In mathematics, a Lamé function, or ellipsoidal harmonic function, is a solution of Lamé's equation, a second-order ordinary differential equation.  It was introduced in the paper . Lamé's equation appears in the method of separation of variables applied to the Laplace equation in elliptic coordinates. In some special cases solutions can be expressed in terms of polynomials called Lamé polynomials.

The Lamé equation 
Lamé's equation is

For other values of B the solutions have branch points.

 

which after a change of variable becomes a special case of Heun's equation.

A more general form of Lamé's equation is the ellipsoidal equation or ellipsoidal wave equation which can be written (observe we now write , not  as above)

For  the equation reduces to the Mathieu equation

The Weierstrassian form of Lamé's equation is quite unsuitable for calculation (as Arscott also remarks, p. 191). The most suitable form of the equation is that in Jacobian form, as above. The algebraic and trigonometric forms are also cumbersome to use. Lamé equations arise in quantum mechanics as equations of small fluctuations about classical solutions—called periodic instantons, bounces or bubbles—of Schrödinger equations for various periodic and anharmonic potentials.

Asymptotic expansions

Asymptotic expansions of periodic ellipsoidal wave functions, and therewith also of Lamé functions, for large values of  have been obtained by Müller.
The asymptotic expansion obtained by him for the eigenvalues  is, with  approximately an odd integer (and to be determined more precisely by boundary conditions – see below),

 

(another (fifth) term not given here has been calculated by Müller, the first three terms have also been obtained by Ince).

 

as well as (the prime meaning derivative)

 

defining respectively the ellipsoidal wave functions

 

of periods  and for  one obtains

 

Here the upper sign refers to the solutions  and the lower to the solutions . Finally expanding  about  one obtains

 

In the limit of the Mathieu equation (to which the Lamé equation can be reduced) these expressions reduce to the  corresponding expressions of the Mathieu case (as shown by Müller).

Notes

References
.
.
. Available at Gallica.

 

Special functions